Multnomah County Library is the public library system serving Portland and Multnomah County, Oregon, United States. A continuation of the Library Association of Portland, established in 1864, the system now has 19 branches offering books, magazines, DVDs, and computers. It is the largest library system in Oregon, serving a population of 724,680, with more than 425,000 registered borrowers.  According to the Public Library Association, it ranks second among U.S. libraries, based on circulation of books and materials, and ranks first among libraries serving fewer than one million residents. In this respect, it is the busiest in the nation.

History
After Leland H. Wakefield began collecting funds door-to-door in 1863, the Mercantile Library Association was started on January 12, 1864, with subscriptions by Portland's merchant elite. Judge Matthew Deady was one of the early founders, with financial support coming from those such as Henry Corbett, William S. Ladd, and Erasmus D. Shattuck among others. The more inclusive Library Association of Portland name was chosen, likely on Judge Deady's suggestion. William Ladd was the elected its first president.  The founders proclaimed "the library should forever be kept free of politics."

By March 1864, there were 153 members, who had subscribed $2,500. Harvey W. Scott served as the first librarian, part-time, at its first location on Stark Street in Portland. In 1869, the library moved to the Ladd & Tilton Bank Building where it received free rent. Deady was the president from 1874 until 1893, and found that fundraising was "like pulling teeth", calling the local establishment "closefisted narrow visioned millionaires" in 1888, also stating "The rich men of Portland will never do much for [the library] until they die, and maybe not then." The first major bequest came from Stephen Skidmore in 1883.

In 1891, a new separate library, the Portland Public Library, was founded by a group that included some former LAP board members. The two libraries merged in 1902.

The library moved to a new two-story stone library building in 1893. The building cost $156,477, representing 27 years of fundraising, mostly by Deady. A large portion of the funds came from Ella M. Smith, daughter of Benjamin F. Smith, in 1889. The library was staffed by D. F. W. Bursch, the library's first trained librarian, who oversaw the implementation of the Dewey Decimal system. It contained 20,000 volumes.

Prior to opening the library for free public access, the board tried to lower subscription costs as often as possible to allow a larger percentage of the general public to have access to the resource. The board debated whether to accept government support, with Deady arguing against, out of concern for the encroachment of political influence, and on the principle that citizens would place more value on something they themselves paid for, even if the payment were small. In 1897, board president George Henry Williams proposed that the librarian be empowered to remove materials deemed to demoralize people and disorganize society," an approach in keeping with common library practice at the time.

The library declined an offer of a $100,000 donation from Andrew Carnegie in 1901, expressing "great pride" in Portland's ability to take care of itself; later, it did accept $105,000 in 1911 and $60,000 in 1912 to build branch locations. The library received nearly 9,000 books in 1900 from the estate of John Wilson; many of these were rare books. However, the bequest called for the books to be available free of charge to the public, thus the board voted to provide library services to the public under government contract. In 1901, the state passed a law to allow governments to tax citizens to pay for libraries; the legislation had been advanced primarily by the newly organized State Federation of Women's Clubs. The city of Portland and the library entered into a contract where the privately owned library continued to own its collection, but the city paid for services, thus creating a free publicly supported library. In January 1901, the library allowed books to circulate for the first time.

On March 16, 1902, Portland's library became the first free library in the state paid for by taxes. At that time it featured more than 38,000 volumes and 215 periodicals. In 1913, the Library Association of Portland (LAP) built the Central Library in downtown Portland at Tenth Street. They did not use any Carnegie funds for the project, instead financing came from  a special two-year tax.

On July 1, 1990, the LAP officially transferred ownership of the library buildings and collections to Multnomah County.

Branches
The Multnomah County Library operates the Central Library in downtown Portland and 18 branches.

Central Library

The Central Library in downtown Portland serves as the main branch of the system. The building was designed by architect A. E. Doyle, and opened on September 6, 1913. It was one of the first libraries in the United States to feature an open-plan. The three-story Central Library was listed on the National Register of Historic Places as the Central Building, Public Library in 1979. It contains  of bookshelf space and has more than 130 computers for the public. The branch contains  of space. From 1994 to 1997, the interior of the Central Library was partially gutted and extensively renovated.

Other branches 
The Albina, St. Johns and North Portland branches are Carnegie libraries. (There were also four Carnegie libraries no longer part of the system: Arleta, East Portland, the old Gresham Library, and South Portland).

Details
As of FY2010, the system has a total of 486 FTE employees, including 91 librarian FTE. Total annual revenue was just over $62.8 million, with expenditures of $60.5 million. There are more than 425,000 library card holders in the system that serves a population of over 700,000 people, the largest in the state. Multnomah County Library has a total of 1,994,541 books, DVDs, CDs, periodicals, and other library materials. There was a total of 5,799,497 visits in FY2010 with the total circulation of 22,715,292. The library is also a depository for the Federal Depository Library Program.

See also
Children's Internet Protection Act

References

Further reading 
 Anderson, Katherine E. Historical Sketch of the Library Association of Portland, 1864-1964.  Portland: The Library Association, 1964.
 Richard E. Ritz, Central Library: Portland's Crown Jewel. Portland: The Library Association, 2000.

External links 

Friends of the Multnomah County Library
The Library Foundation
1892 & 1893 Annual Report

 
1864 establishments in Oregon
Buildings and structures in Multnomah County, Oregon
Carnegie libraries in Oregon
County library systems in Oregon
Federal depository libraries
Libraries established in 1864